= Turia (band) =

Dutch metal band

Turia is a Dutch atmospheric black metal band. They havee released three albums.

The band was founded in 2014.

== Select discography ==
- Dor (2015)
- Dede Kondre (2017)
- De oord (split with Fluisteraars, 2018)
- Degen van licht (2020)
