= Fluisteraars =

Dutch metal band

Fluisteraars ("Whisperers") is a Dutch post-black metal band. They released six albums, all through the label Eisenwald records.

== Select discography ==
=== Albums ===
- Dromers (2014)
- Luwte (2015)
- Bloem (2020)
- Gegrepen door de geest der zielsontluiking (2021)
- Manifestaties van de ontworteling (2024)
- Jacht der mysteriën (2026)

=== EPs and splits ===
- Gelderland (EP, 2016)
- De oord (split with Turia, 2018)
- De kronieken van het verdwenen kasteel I – Harslo (EP, 2023)
- De kronieken van het verdwenen kasteel II – Nergena (EP, 023)
- De kronieken van het verdwenen kasteel III – Grunsfoort (EP, 2025)
